Miss World Malta is a national Beauty pageant for selecting a delegate to represent Malta at the  Miss World pageant. This pageant is not related to Miss Malta pageant.

History
The winners of the national pageant are selected at different competitions as each is owned by a different organization. Usually, the Miss World Malta is held by midsummer every year, and sends the winner of this contest to Miss World to be happened in the later months of the year. The current winner of this pageant is Joanna Galea from Zejtun, 23 years old, who also represented Malta in Miss Italia Nel Mondo 2011 Edition. As of 2009, Malta has claimed only one semi-finalist in Miss World.

From 1965 to 2001, representatives were sent to Miss World under the national pageant, Miss Malta. A new organization had launched in 2002 to send its delegates to the Miss World pageant, under the name, Miss World Malta.

Titleholders
Color key

See also
 Miss Malta

References

External links
 Pageantopolis
 Official website

Recurring events established in 1965
Beauty pageants in Malta
Maltese awards